Michelle Koh (born 30 September 1990) is a Malaysian professional golfer who qualified for the 2016 Summer Olympics in Rio de Janeiro, Brazil.

Career
In college, Koh competed for Campbell University.

Koh was part of the women's team in the 2009 Southeast Asian Games that won a bronze medal.

She won the 2015 CTBC Shanghai Ladies Classic on the China LPGA Tour.

Amateur wins
2012 Warren-Ford Amateur Open
2013 Warren-Ford Amateur Open, China Amateur, Selangor Amateur Open
2014 MGA National Trial, Malaysian Amateur Close, Mazda Pahang Amateur Open Championship

Source:

Professional wins
2015 CTBC Shanghai Ladies Classic (China LPGA Tour)
2016 Kenda Tires TLPGA Open (Taiwan LPGA Tour)

References

External links

China LPGA profile
Yahoo sports profile

Malaysian female golfers
Olympic golfers of Malaysia
Golfers at the 2016 Summer Olympics
Southeast Asian Games medalists in golf
Southeast Asian Games bronze medalists for Malaysia
Competitors at the 2009 Southeast Asian Games
Campbell Lady Camels golfers
Malaysian people of Chinese descent
1990 births
Living people
Place of birth missing (living people)